Brent Gretzky (born February 20, 1972) is a Canadian former professional ice hockey player, and the brother of Wayne and Keith Gretzky. He briefly played in the National Hockey League (NHL) for the Tampa Bay Lightning.

Playing career
Gretzky was taught the game by his father Walter. As a youth, he played in the 1985 and 1986 Quebec International Pee-Wee Hockey Tournaments with a minor ice hockey team from Brantford.

Gretzky grew up playing minor hockey in Brantford, Ontario for the Brantford Classics of the OMHA. In 1988–89, he played Jr. B hockey for the Brantford Classics of the Mid-Western Junior B Hockey League. He was selected in the 1st round (6th overall) of the 1989 OHL Priority Selection by the Belleville Bulls where he spent three years With the Bulls, he was a linemate of future NHL player Darren McCarty. Gretzky was drafted by the expansion Tampa Bay Lightning in the 1992 NHL Entry Draft, but did not find the same success as his brother Wayne.

During Gretzky's 13-game tenure with Tampa Bay, he played once against brother Wayne: "We must have faced off 15 times and I won one. I remember chasing him behind the net. I knew what he was going to do and I still found myself looking for my jock. The hardest part was after the game, going and watching ESPN. It was older Gretzky shows young Gretzky how to play hockey."

Together, Wayne and Brent hold the NHL record for most combined points by two brothers - 2,857 for Wayne and 4 for Brent, and are second overall in points scored by any number of brothers (behind the six brothers of the Sutter family who combined for 2,934 NHL points - 73 more than Wayne and Brent, although the Gretzkys' combined totals are greater than any five of the six Sutters.)

Gretzky's selection by an expansion team in an era when established teams were only obliged to leave the bottom echelon of their players unprotected in expansion drafts has led to speculation that he might have never made it onto an NHL roster if he had been drafted by an established team. Other than his brief stint in Tampa Bay, Gretzky was a career minor leaguer, floating between the International Hockey League, the American Hockey League, and the United Hockey League. He played for EC Graz Austria in 1997-98. On June 6, 2006, the Elmira Jackals announced they had acquired his rights from the Motor City Mechanics, but he never played with Elmira; his season with the Mechanics was his last as a professional. He and four other former Danbury Trashers players were served with subpoenas by the FBI in its investigation into owner James Galante's business dealings.

In 2008, Gretzky played six games for his hometown Brantford Blast team in the senior league Major League Hockey, which went on to win the 2008 Allan Cup, after which Gretzky retired from organized competition. He now serves as a police officer with the Ontario Provincial Police.

Career statistics

Regular season and playoffs

See also
List of family relations in the National Hockey League

References

External links

 The Ukrainian Weekly piece on Brent Gretzky
 Article on James Galante's business dealings

1972 births
Living people
Asheville Smoke players
Atlanta Knights players
EC Graz players
Belleville Bulls players
Canadian ice hockey centres
Canadian people of Belarusian descent
Chicago Wolves (IHL) players
Danbury Trashers players
Fort Wayne Komets players
Brent
Hershey Bears players
Ice hockey people from Ontario
Las Vegas Thunder players
Motor City Mechanics players
Pensacola Ice Pilots players
Port Huron Beacons players
Port Huron Border Cats players
Quebec Rafales players
Sportspeople from Brantford
St. John's Maple Leafs players
Tampa Bay Lightning draft picks
Tampa Bay Lightning players
Canadian expatriate ice hockey players in Austria
Canadian expatriate ice hockey players in the United States